The 2010 Asian Indoor Athletics Championships, also known as the IV Asian Indoor Athletics Championships, was an international indoor athletics event took place in Tehran, Iran, between 24 and 26 February. This was the second edition to be hosted in the country as the first championships was also held at the Aftab Enghelab Complex in Tehran. A total of 23 nations sent athletes to compete at the championships, which featured 26 track and field events.

The championships featured somewhat moderate performances – India, who topped the table at the previous edition, decided against sending a number of their top athletes. However, for many athletes it acted as a testing ground in the build up to the 2010 IAAF World Indoor Championships in March. The hosts Iran topped the medal table with five golds. China was second with four golds while Kazakhstan had the second greatest medal haul with a total of 14. Six Asian Indoor Championships records were broken or equalled at the championships.

The female events were held separately from the men's events, taking place during the morning sessions. Due to the Islamic country's customs, men were forbidden from watching the female events. All four of Kyrgyzstan's medals were won by only two women: twenty-year-old Viktoriia Poliudina won both the 1500 metres and 3000 metres events while her compatriot Tatyana Borisova managed an 800 metres silver and 1500 m bronze. Kazakhstan's Oksana Verner was another athlete to win two individual medals as she took silver behind Poliudina on both occasions. Satyender Singh's personal best and championship record throw in the shot put was one of highlights of the programme, although the women's pole vault was a less-contested affair as only two athletes took part.

It was later revealed that Oksana Verner and 400 metres gold medallist Munira Saleh failed a drugs test at the event and was banned from the sport for two years and life respectively.

Results

Men

Women

Medal table

Participating nations
A total of 23 nations were represented by athletes competing at the 2010 championships. This was a smaller amount than the total number of nations that attended the 2008 edition (29).

 (2)
 (14)
 (6)
 (18)
 (1)
 (57)
 (9)
 (6)
 (23)
 (5)
 (4)
 (3)
 (5)
 (5)
 (2)
 (5)
 (2)
 (10)
 (4)
 (3)
 (5)
 (1)
 (3)

References

External links
Asian Athletics Association website (archived)
Official website

Indoor 2010
Asian Indoor Championships
Asian Indoor Championships
International athletics competitions hosted by Iran
Asian
2010 in Asian sport